Temnosoma is a genus of bees belonging to the family Halictidae.

The species of this genus are found in Central and Southern America.

Species:

Temnosoma aeruginosum 
Temnosoma fulvipes 
Temnosoma laevigatum 
Temnosoma malachisis 
Temnosoma metallicum 
Temnosoma smaragdinum 
Temnosoma sphaerocephalum

References

Halictidae